Magenta Air was an airline based in Lima, Peru, which operated scheduled domestic services.

History
The airline was established in 2002 and started operations in September of that year. It was wholly owned by Peruvian nationals. Its first aircraft, a Bombardier Dash 8 Q100 had already been acquired in July. In 2004, a Boeing 737-200 joined the fleet. Both aircraft were withdrawn from service in early 2005, which marks the end of the Managnta Air flight operations. Its assets were sold to Aero Continente and Star Perú.

Destinations
At January 2005 Magenta Air operated scheduled services to the following domestic destinations: Cajamarca, Iquitos, Lima, Pucallpa and Tarapoto.

Fleet
The airline had formerly operated the following aircraft:

1 Boeing 737-200 (Leased from Atlantic Airlines de Honduras)
1 Bombardier Dash 8 Q100

References

External links

Defunct airlines of Peru
Airlines established in 2002
Airlines disestablished in 2005
2002 establishments in Peru